Omar Abdi is a Somali-Canadian diplomat. He serves as the Deputy Executive Director of the United Nations Children’s Fund (UNICEF).

Education
Abdi has a bachelor of science in civil engineering from the Somali National University in Mogadishu. He later received a doctoral degree in development economics and a master’s in regional development planning, both from Cornell University.

Career
Abdi held several leadership positions in UNICEF including as Country Representative in Pakistan, Ghana and Liberia, Regional Director in the Middle-East and North Africa, Comptroller and CFO, and Deputy Executive Director for Management, and Field Results.  

Since 2016, following an appointment by United Nations Secretary-General Ban Ki-moon, Abdi has been serving as the Deputy Executive Director for programmes at UNICEF; he succeeded Geeta Rao Gupta. In this capacity, he oversees UNICEF’s global humanitarian and development programmes. In 2020, he was part of the selection committee that chose José Manuel Barroso as chair of GAVI’s board.

Other activities
 Global Partnership for Education (GPE), Member of the Board of Directors
 Partnership for Maternal, Newborn & Child Health (PMNCH), Member of the Board

References

Year of birth missing (living people)
Living people
UNICEF people
Canadian diplomats
Somalian diplomats
Somalian emigrants to Canada
Canadian officials of the United Nations
Somali National University alumni